

With around 2000 species, Cortinarius is the biggest genus of fungi that form mushrooms. Apart from a few species such as C. caperatus, many even so-called edible species appear to have very similar species that are at least inedible if not poisonous, or otherwise may differ in edibility geographically.

A B C D E F G H I J K L M N O P Q R S T U V U W X Y Z

A

Cortinarius abditus – France
Cortinarius aberrans – France
Cortinarius abietinus
Cortinarius abnormis – Western Australia
Cortinarius absarokensis – USA (Montana)
Cortinarius absinthiacus – Argentina
Cortinarius acerbiformis – France
Cortinarius acerbus – Argentina
Cortinarius achrous – New Zealand
Cortinarius achyrocephalus
Cortinarius aciculisporus – France
Cortinarius acidophilus – Norway
Cortinarius acigemmascens – France
Cortinarius aciserratus
Cortinarius acutellus – France
Cortinarius acutibulbus – France
Cortinarius acutispissipes – France
Cortinarius acutoaltus – France
Cortinarius acutocephalus – France
Cortinarius acutus
Cortinarius adustus
Cortinarius aerugineoconicus - New Zealand
Cortinarius aggregatus
Cortinarius ainsworthii – UK
Cortinarius albertii – Europe
Cortinarius albidus – (North America)
Cortinarius alboviolaceus – silver-violet webcap (Europe)
Cortinarius alcalinophilus – Europe
Cortinarius altissimus – Guyana
Cortinarius aleuriosmus – Europe
Cortinarius amethystinus
Cortinarius amoenelens = C. cyanopus
Cortinarius angulosus
Cortinarius anisochrous – Europe
Cortinarius anomaloochrascens – Europe
Cortinarius anomalus
Cortinarius anserinus – Europe
Cortinarius aquilanus – Europe
Cortinarius arcifolius – Europe
Cortinarius archeri – Australia
Cortinarius arcuatorum – Europe
Cortinarius ardesiacus – Australia
Cortinarius argentatus
Cortinarius argenteolilacinus – Europe
Cortinarius argyrionus
Cortinarius armeniacus
Cortinarius armillatus – bracelet cortinar (North America)
Cortinarius athabascus – North America
Cortinarius atkinsonianus
Cortinarius atrolazulinus – New Zealand
Cortinarius atropileatus – New Zealand
Cortinarius atrotomentosus – USA (Florida)
Cortinarius atrovirens – Europe
Cortinarius aurae – UK
Cortinarius aurantiobasalis – Europe
Cortinarius aurantiobasis – edible, but deadly look-alikes (C. gentilis)
Cortinarius aureifolius – edible, but deadly look-alikes (C. gentilis)
Cortinarius aureocalceolatus – Europe
Cortinarius aureofulvus– Europe
Cortinarius aureopulverulentus – Europe
Cortinarius aurilicis – Europe
Cortinarius australiensis (skirt webcap) (previously Rozites australiensis) - Australia
Cortinarius austrocinnabarinus – Australia
Cortinarius austrotorvus – Australia
Cortinarius austrovaginatus – Australia and New Zealand
Cortinarius austrovenetus - also known as Dermocybe austroveneta Green Skin-head Australia
Cortinarius austroviolaceus - Australia

B

Cortinarius badiolaevis
Cortinarius balteato-cumatilis
Cortinarius balteatialutaceus – Fennoscandia
Cortinarius balteatiabulbosus – Europe
Cortinarius balteaticlavatus – South Finland to Lapland
Cortinarius balteatus
Cortinarius basorapulus
Cortinarius beeverorum – New Zealand
Cortinarius bellus - New Zealand
Cortinarius biformis
Cortinarius bigelowii
Cortinarius bivelus
Cortinarius bolaris
Cortinarius boreicyanites – Northern Europe
Cortinarius boreidionysae – Finland
Cortinarius bovinaster – Europe
Cortinarius bovinatus – Europe
Cortinarius bovinus – Europe
Cortinarius boulderensis
Cortinarius britannicus  – UK
Cortinarius brunneiaurantius – Finland
Cortinarius brunneus
Cortinarius builliardi
Cortinarius bulbosus

C

Cortinarius cabrinii – Argentina
Cortinarius cacaocolor
Cortinarius cacodes – USA (California)
Cortinarius cadaverolens – France
Cortinarius caelicolor
Cortinarius caeruleo-ochrascens – France
Cortinarius caeruleogriseus – France
Cortinarius caeruleoëburneus – Australia
Cortinarius caerulescens – mealy bigfoot webcap
Cortinarius caerulipes
Cortinarius caesia – France
Cortinarius caesibulga – Australia
Cortinarius caesiellus – USA
Cortinarius caesiifolius – USA
Cortinarius caesiifolius
Cortinarius caesiobrunneus – Finland
Cortinarius caesiocanescens – Austria
Cortinarius caesiocolor – Finland
Cortinarius caesiocyaneus
Cortinarius caesiocinctus – France
Cortinarius caesiocortinatus – Austria
Cortinarius caesioflavescens – France
Cortinarius caesiogriseus – Austria
Cortinarius caesiolamellatus – Europe, USA
Cortinarius caesiolatens – France
Cortinarius caesionigrellus – France
Cortinarius caesiophylloides – Fennoscandia
Cortinarius caesiostramenius
Cortinarius californicus
Cortinarius callisteus – edible, but deadly look-alikes (C. gentilis)
Cortinarius calochrous
Cortinarius calyptratus
Cortinarius calyptrodermus
Cortinarius camphoratus
Cortinarius carneipallidus – New Zealand)
Cortinarius caninus
Cortinarius caperatus (previously Rozites caperata) gypsy mushroom (Europe, North America)
Cortinarius castaneicolor
Cortinarius catarracticus - Australia
Cortinarius cedretorum
Cortinarius cesarioanus – New Zealand
Cortinarius chrysma – New Zealand
Cortinarius cinereoroseolus
Cortinarius cinnabarinus
Cortinarius cinnamomeus – also known as Dermocybe cinnamomea (Europe, North America), may be edible, but has deadly look-alikes (C. gentilis)
Cortinarius cinnamomeus-luteus – edible, but deadly look-alikes (C. gentilis)
Cortinarius cisqhale – North America
Cortinarius citrinifolius
Cortinarius citrinipedes
Cortinarius citrino-olivaceus
Cortinarius clandestinus
Cortinarius claricolor – eaten in Europe, unknown edibility in North America
Cortinarius cliduchus
Cortinarius coerulescentium
Cortinarius collinitus – belted slimy cort (North America)
Cortinarius controversus – Australia
Cortinarius corrugatus
Cortinarius corrugis
Cortinarius cotoneus
Cortinarius crassus
Cortinarius cremeiamarescens – Southern Europe and western North America
Cortinarius croceofolius – edible, but deadly look-alikes (C. gentilis)
Cortinarius crocolitus
Cortinarius cruentipellis – Northwest Europe
Cortinarius crystallinus
Cortinarius cucumeris - New Zealand
Cortinarius cumatilis
Cortinarius cupreorufus
Cortinarius cuprescens – France
Cortinarius cyanites
Cortinarius cyanosterix – France
Cortinarius cyanus
Cortinarius cycneus – New Zealand
Cortinarius cylindratus – France
Cortinarius cylindripes
Cortinarius cylindrisporus – USA (Florida)
Cortinarius cylindrospermus – Argentina
Cortinarius cypriacus
Cortinarius cystidifer
Cortinarius cystidiocatenatus – Australia
Cortinarius cystidiophorus – France
Cortinarius cystidiorapaceus – Argentina

D

Cortinarius damascenus
Cortinarius debbieae
Cortinarius deceptivissimus – France
Cortinarius decipiens
Cortinarius decipientoides – France
Cortinarius decurtatus – France
Cortinarius deianae – France
Cortinarius delibutus
Cortinarius diaphorus – New Zealand
Cortinarius dibaphus
Cortinarius dilutus
Cortinarius distans
Cortinarius dulciolens – New Zealand
Cortinarius dulciorum – New Zealand
Cortinarius dunensis – Belgium
Cortinarius duracinellus
Cortinarius duracinobtusus
Cortinarius duracinus
Cortinarius duramarus

E

Cortinarius eartoxicus – Australia (Tasmania)
Cortinarius elacatipus – New Zealand
Cortinarius elaiochrous – New Zealand
Cortinarius elaiops – New Zealand
Cortinarius elaphinicolor – France
Cortinarius elatior - Europe
Cortinarius elatostipitatus – Australia (Tasmania)
Cortinarius eldoradoensis – North America
Cortinarius eliae – France
Cortinarius elegans Reumaux, 1989
Cortinarius elegantioides
Cortinarius elegantior
Cortinarius elotoides – USA (Wyoming)
Cortinarius elytropus – France
Cortinarius emilii – France
Cortinarius emollitoides – France
Cortinarius epileucus – Argentina
Cortinarius epiphaeus – New Zealand
Cortinarius epipurrus – France
Cortinarius epsomiensis – England
Cortinarius erythraeus – Australia
Cortinarius erythrinellus – France
Cortinarius erythrofuscus – Spain
Cortinarius esculentus
Cortinarius eutactus – New Zealand
Cortinarius evanescens – Papua New Guinea
Cortinarius evernius
Cortinarius exlugubris – New Zealand

F

Cortinarius fallaciosus – France
Cortinarius falsosus – France
Cortinarius famatus – France
Cortinarius fasciatus
Cortinarius fascicularoides – France
Cortinarius fistularioides – France
Cortinarius flavidolilacinus
Cortinarius flavidulus – New Zealand
Cortinarius flavifolius
Cortinarius flavipallens – Finland
Cortinarius flavivelatus – Sweden
Cortinarius flavovirens
Cortinarius flexipes
Cortinarius fragrans
Cortinarius fraudulosus
Cortinarius fulgens
Cortinarius fulmineus
Cortinarius fuscobovinus – Europe
Cortinarius fuscobovinaster – Europe
Cortinarius fuscoumbonatus – Australia
Cortinarius fusisemen – France

G

Cortinarius gaiacofuscus – France
Cortinarius galeacampanulatus – France
Cortinarius galeobdolon
Cortinarius galeriniformis – Brazil
Cortinarius galerinoides – France
Cortinarius gallairei – France
Cortinarius gallurae – Italy
Cortinarius gallurensis – Italy
Cortinarius gamundiae – Argentina
Cortinarius gaudiosus – Argentina
Cortinarius gausapatus – Switzerland
Cortinarius gayi – Argentina
Cortinarius gemmeus – New Zealand
Cortinarius gentianeus – France
Cortinarius gentilis
Cortinarius gentilissimus – USA
Cortinarius geophilus – France
Cortinarius georgianae – France
Cortinarius georgiolens – France
Cortinarius geosmus
Cortinarius glaucopus
Cortinarius griseoluridus
Cortinarius griseoviolaceus
Cortinarius gualalaensis – North America
Cortinarius gymnocephalus – New Zealand

H

Cortinarius haasii
Cortinarius hallowellensis  – Western Australia and Tasmania
Cortinarius haematochelis
Cortinarius haematocheloides – France
Cortinarius harrisii – Australia
Cortinarius hebelomaticus – New Zealand
Cortinarius hebelomoides – USA
Cortinarius hedyaromaticus – USA (Montana)
Cortinarius harrisonii – USA
Cortinarius heatherae – UK
Cortinarius heliotropicus
Cortinarius helobius – France
Cortinarius helodes – USA (Wyoming)
Cortinarius helvelloides
Cortinarius helveolus
Cortinarius helviodor – France
Cortinarius hemitrichus
Cortinarius henricii – France
Cortinarius henryanus – France
Cortinarius herbarum – France
Cortinarius herculeolens – France
Cortinarius herculeus – Morocco
Cortinarius herculinus – France
Cortinarius herculoides – Mauritania
Cortinarius hercynicus
Cortinarius hercynius
Cortinarius herpeticus
Cortinarius hesleri – eastern North America
Cortinarius heterochroma – Argentina
Cortinarius heterochromus
Cortinarius heterocyclus – Sweden
Cortinarius heterosporus
Cortinarius hiemalis – France
Cortinarius hillieri – France
Cortinarius hinnuleoarmillatus – France
Cortinarius hinnuleolus – France
Cortinarius hinnuleoradicatus – France
Cortinarius hinnuleoscitus – France
Cortinarius hinnuleovelatus – France
Cortinarius hinnuleus
Cortinarius hinnuloides
Cortinarius hircinoides
Cortinarius hircinosmus – France
Cortinarius hircinus
Cortinarius hircosus
Cortinarius hirtipes
Cortinarius hoffmannii – France
Cortinarius holojanthinus – Argentina
Cortinarius holophaeus
Cortinarius holovioleipes – France
Cortinarius holoxanthus
Cortinarius homomorphus – France
Cortinarius hoplites – Iceland
Cortinarius horakii – Los Lagos
Cortinarius hualo – Chile
Cortinarius hujusmodi – France
Cortinarius humboldtensis – edible, but deadly look-alikes (C. gentilis)
Cortinarius humicola
Cortinarius humilior – France
Cortinarius humilis – Argentina
Cortinarius humolens – Italy
Cortinarius huronensis – USA

I

Cortinarius ignellus
Cortinarius ignotus
Cortinarius illibatus
Cortinarius illuminus
Cortinarius immixtus
Cortinarius impennis
Cortinarius incisus
Cortinarius indigoverus - New Guinea 
Cortinarius indolicus - New Zealand
Cortinarius infernalis
Cortinarius infractiflavus – Wyoming, Europe
Cortinarius infractus
Cortinarius insignitus – France
Cortinarius integerrimus – France
Cortinarius intempestivus – France
Cortinarius inusitatus – Spain
Cortinarius iodes
Cortinarius iodioides
Cortinarius ionema – USA (Washington)
Cortinarius ionodactylus
Cortinarius ionomataius
Cortinarius ionophyllus
Cortinarius iringa – New Zealand
Cortinarius isabellae – France

J
Cortinarius jacobi-langei
Cortinarius jacobii – France
Cortinarius janthinocaulis
Cortinarius janthinophaeus – Chile
Cortinarius  jimenezianus – Spain
Cortinarius joannis
Cortinarius jonimitchelliae - Sweden (holotype), Estonia, Italy. Named after musician Joni Mitchell.
Cortinarius josephii
Cortinarius josserandii – France
Cortinarius junghuhnii

K
Cortinarius kaimanawa
Cortinarius kaputarensis
Cortinarius kerrii - Brazil
Cortinarius kioloensis - New Zealand and Australia
Cortinarius koldingensis
Cortinarius kytoevuorii – Finland

L

Cortinarius laetelamellatus – Australia
Cortinarius laetissimus
Cortinarius laniger
Cortinarius lamproxanthus
Cortinarius laniger
Cortinarius laquellus
Cortinarius largus
Cortinarius latus
Cortinarius lavendulensis
Cortinarius leucanthemium – Australia
Cortinarius luteicolor – Pacific Northwest region of North America
Cortinarius lilacinus
Cortinarius lividoochraceus
Cortinarius lucorum
Cortinarius lustratus
Cortinarius luteiaureus – Finland
Cortinarius luteoarmillatus

M

Cortinarius maculobulga
Cortinarius magellanicus – South America, New Zealand
Cortinarius magnivelatus
Cortinarius malachius
Cortinarius malicorius – also known as Dermocybe malicoria (North America)
Cortinarius malosinae – New Zealand
Cortinarius marylandensis – North America
Cortinarius mastoideus – Australia
Cortinarius meleagris (previously Rozites meleagris) – New Zealand
Cortinarius melleicarneus – Estonia and Norway
Cortinarius metallicus (previously Rozites metallica) Australia
Cortinarius metarius
Cortinarius michiganensis
Cortinarius microarcheri - Australia
Cortinarius miniatopus
Cortinarius minorisporus – New Zealand
Cortinarius miwok – North America
Cortinarius montanus
Cortinarius morrisii - North America
Cortinarius moserianus –Europe
Cortinarius myrtilliphilus – Finland and Norway
Cortinarius mucifluus
Cortinarius mucosus
Cortinarius multiformus – eaten in Europe, unknown edibility in North America
Cortinarius mutabilis
Cortinarius myxenosma – New Zealand

N
Cortinarius nanceiensis
Cortinarius naphthalinus
Cortinarius napivelatus
Cortinarius nebulobrunneus
Cortinarius necessarius
Cortinarius neosanguineus – North America
Cortinarius neotropicus – Costa Rica to Columbia
Cortinarius nigrocuspidatus

O

Cortinarius obtusus
Cortinarius occidentalis
Cortinarius ochribubalinus – Finland
Cortinarius odorifer
Cortinarius ohlone – California 
Cortinarius olivaceopictus – edible, but deadly look-alikes (C. gentilis)
Cortinarius olympianus
Cortinarius orellanosus
Cortinarius orellanus – Europe, North America
Cortinarius orichalceus
Cortinarius orixanthus – New Zealand
Cortinarius osloensis - Norway
Cortinarius osmorphus
Cortinarius oulankaensis – Europe

P

Cortinarius pachynemeus
Cortinarius pachypus
Cortinarius pachythelis
Cortinarius pachythrix
Cortinarius paguentus
Cortinarius palazonianus
Cortinarius palatinus– Costa Rica
Cortinarius paleaceus
Cortinarius paliformis
Cortinarius pallens
Cortinarius pallescens
Cortinarius pallidifolius
Cortinarius pallidipes
Cortinarius pallidirimosus – Europe, Oregon (USA)
Cortinarius pallidogriseus
Cortinarius pallidolamellatus
Cortinarius pallidolutescens
Cortinarius pallidophyllus
Cortinarius pallidostriatoides
Cortinarius pallidostriatus
Cortinarius pallidulus
Cortinarius pallidus
Cortinarius palmicola
Cortinarius paludicola
Cortinarius paludinellus
Cortinarius paludophilus
Cortinarius paludosus
Cortinarius panchrous
Cortinarius panellus
Cortinarius pangloius
Cortinarius pansa
Cortinarius pantherinus
Cortinarius papaver
Cortinarius papuanus
Cortinarius papulosus
Cortinarius parabibulus
Cortinarius paracephalixus
Cortinarius paracinnamomeus
Cortinarius paracrassus
Cortinarius paracyanopus
Cortinarius paradoxus
Cortinarius parafraudulosus
Cortinarius paragaudis
Cortinarius parahumilis
Cortinarius paralbocyaneus
Cortinarius paramethystinus
Cortinarius paramoenolens
Cortinarius paranomalus
Cortinarius paraochraceus
Cortinarius paraonui
Cortinarius paraphaeochrous
Cortinarius paraplatypus
Cortinarius parapluvius
Cortinarius parasebaceus
Cortinarius parastemmatus
Cortinarius parasuaveolens
Cortinarius parasuillus
Cortinarius paraviolaceus
Cortinarius paraxanthus
Cortinarius parazureus
Cortinarius pardinipes
Cortinarius pardinus
Cortinarius pardipes
Cortinarius parelegantior
Cortinarius parevernius
Cortinarius parfumatus
Cortinarius parherpeticus
Cortinarius parhonestus
Cortinarius parinsignis
Cortinarius parkeri
Cortinarius parksianus
Cortinarius parolivascens
Cortinarius paropimus
Cortinarius paruraceus
Cortinarius parvannulatus
Cortinarius parvepilus
Cortinarius parvostriatus
Cortinarius parvulisemen
Cortinarius parvulobtusus
Cortinarius parvulus
Cortinarius pastoralis - Finland (holotype), Estonia, Sweden
Cortinarius patibilis
Cortinarius patrickensis – California, Sweden
Cortinarius paucicolor
Cortinarius pavelekii
Cortinarius pauperculus
Cortinarius paxilloides
Cortinarius pearsonii
Cortinarius pectochelis – New Zealand
Cortinarius percomis
Cortinarius phoeniceus – also known as Dermocybe phoenicea (Europe)
Cortinarius pholideus
Cortinarius pinetorum
Cortinarius pinigaudis
Cortinarius pisciodorus – New Zealand
Cortinarius planodepressus
Cortinarius platypus
Cortinarius plicatus
Cortinarius plumiger
Cortinarius plumbosoides
Cortinarius plumbosus
Cortinarius plumulosus
Cortinarius pluvialis
Cortinarius pluviorum
Cortinarius pluvius
Cortinarius ponderosus
Cortinarius porphyroideus - New Zealand
Cortinarius porphyropus
Cortinarius praestans – goliath webcap (Europe)
Cortinarius praestigiosus
Cortinarius prasinocyaneus - Europe
Cortinarius prasinus
Cortinarius privignus
Cortinarius psammocephalus
Cortinarius pselioticton – New Zealand
Cortinarius pseudoarquatus
Cortinarius pseudobolaris
Cortinarius pseudocandelaris
Cortinarius pseudocaninus
Cortinarius pseudocalopus
Cortinarius pseudocephalixus
Cortinarius pseudoclaricolor
Cortinarius pseudocollinitus
Cortinarius pseudocompar
Cortinarius pseudocrassoides
Cortinarius pseudocyanites
Cortinarius pseudocupreorufus – Washington
Cortinarius pseudorotundisporus – Australia
Cortinarius pseudosalor
Cortinarius pulchellus
Cortinarius puniceus – Europe
Cortinarius purpurascens – Europe
Cortinarius purpureocapitatus – New Zealand
Cortinarius pustulatus
Cortinarius pyriodorus

Q
Cortinarius quaerendus – France
Cortinarius quarciticus – Sweden
Cortinarius quaresimalis – Australia (Tasmania)
Cortinarius quercoarmillatus – Costa Rica
Cortinarius querculus – France
Cortinarius quidemolens – France
Cortinarius quietus – France

R

Cortinarius raphanoides – edible, but deadly look-alikes (C. gentilis)
Cortinarius rattinoides – New Zealand
Cortinarius regalis
Cortinarius renidens
Cortinarius rhipiduranus – New Zealand
Cortinarius rigidus
Cortinarius roseoarmillatus
Cortinarius rotundisporus – Australia
Cortinarius rozites – Australia
Cortinarius rubellus
Cortinarius rubicundulus
Cortinarius rubripes
Cortinarius rubripurpuratus
Cortinarius rufo-olivaceus
Cortinarius rugosolilacinus
Cortinarius russus

S

Cortinarius salor – Europe, east to Japan and New Guinea
Cortinarius sanguineus – Europe, North America
Cortinarius saturninus
Cortinarius scandens
Cortinarius scaurus
Cortinarius scoticus – UK
Cortinarius semisanguineus – also known as Dermocybe semisanguinea red-gilled cortinar (Europe & North America)
Cortinarius selinolens – France, Spain, Tunisia
Cortinarius serarius
Cortinarius sierraensis – North America
Cortinarius sinapicolor – Australia
Cortinarius sinapivelus
Cortinarius smithii – North America
Cortinarius sodagnitus – United Kingdom
Cortinarius sphaerosporus
Cortinarius splendens – also known as Cortinarius resplendissant, Splendid Webcap (Europe)
Cortinarius splendidus – also known as Dermocybe splendida splendid red skin-head Australia
Cortinarius squamulosus – edible, but related species have unclassified edibility
Cortinarius stemmatus
Cortinarius sterilis
Cortinarius stillatitius
Cortinarius subarcheri – Australia
Cortinarius subargentatus
Cortinarius subcalyptrosporus – Malaysia
Cortinarius subcastanellus (previously Rozites castanella) - New Zealand
Cortinarius subcuspidatus
Cortinarius subflexipes
Cortinarius subfoetidus
Cortinarius subfraudulosus – Fennoscandia, Estonia
Cortinarius sublargus - Australia
Cortinarius suboenochelis
Cortinarius subpulchrifolius
Cortinarius subpurpurascens
Cortinarius subpurpureophyllus
Cortinarius subpurpureus
Cortinarius subrubrovelatus – Europe
Cortinarius subsaniosus – UK
Cortinarius subtestaceus
Cortinarius subtortus
Cortinarius superbus

T

Cortinarius talimultiformis – Europe
Cortinarius talus
Cortinarius tammii
Cortinarius tasmacamphoratus – Australia
Cortinarius tauri – Spain
Cortinarius taylorianus – New Zealand
Cortinarius tenebrosus
Cortinarius terribilis – France
Cortinarius tessiae – New Zealand
Cortinarius testaceofolius – Sweden
Cortinarius testaceofractus – France
Cortinarius testaceoviolascens – France
Cortinarius thalliosubflavescens – France
Cortinarius thaumastus
Cortinarius thiersianus – USA
Cortinarius thiersii – edible, but deadly look-alikes (C. gentilis)
Cortinarius tigrellus
Cortinarius torvovelatus – France
Cortinarius torvus
Cortinarius traganus – gassy webcap (Europe)
Cortinarius triformis
Cortinarius trivialis
Cortinarius triumphans
Cortinarius truckeensis – North America (Truckee, California)
Cortinarius tuolumnensis – North America
Cortinarius turbinatoides – Italy
Cortinarius turbinatorum – Spain
Cortinarius turgidulus – France
Cortinarius turmalis

U
Cortinarius ulematus – Australia (Tasmania)
Cortinarius uliginosus
Cortinarius umbonatoides
Cortinarius umbrinolutescens
Cortinarius umbrinomammosus – France
Cortinarius undulatofibrillosus – Czech Republic
Cortinarius uraceus
Cortinarius urbicus
Cortinarius ursus – New Zealand

V

Cortinarius vacciniophilus – Norway
Cortinarius vaccinochelis – France
Cortinarius vaccinus – France
Cortinarius vaginatopus  – France
Cortinarius vaginatus – Argentina
Cortinarius vagnetoi – France
Cortinarius validus
Cortinarius van-campiae – Italy
Cortinarius vanduzerensis
Cortinarius variebulbus – France
Cortinarius variecolor – Europe
Cortinarius variegatuloides – France
Cortinarius variegatulus – Argentina
Cortinarius variicolor
Cortinarius variiformis – Morocco
Cortinarius variipes – France
Cortinarius variosimilis – USA (Wyoming)
Cortinarius varius
Cortinarius velatocaulis – France
Cortinarius velatus
Cortinarius velenovskyanus  – France
Cortinarius velenovskyi – France
Cortinarius velicopia
Cortinarius velicopius – USA (Michigan)
Cortinarius velutinellus – North European Russia
Cortinarius venenosus – Japan
Cortinarius veneris – France
Cortinarius venosifolius – France
Cortinarius ventricosus – USA (Wyoming)
Cortinarius venustissimus – Sweden
Cortinarius verallopus – France
Cortinarius veraprilis
Cortinarius verecundus – New Caledonia
Cortinarius veregregius – France
Cortinarius vernalis
Cortinarius vernicifer – New Zealand
Cortinarius vernicosus – USA (Washington)
Cortinarius vernus – Sweden
Cortinarius veronicae – New Zealand
Cortinarius veronicoides – Australia
Cortinarius verrucisporus
Cortinarius verruculosus
Cortinarius vesterholtii – Europe
Cortinarius vibratilis
Cortinarius violaceocystidiatus – New Zealand
Cortinarius violaceus – purple cortinar (Europe), violet cort (North America)
Cortinarius virentophyllus
Cortinarius viridans – Cyprus
Cortinarius viridipileatus – New Zealand
Cortinarius viscoviridis
Cortinarius vitreopileatus
Cortinarius volvatus
Cortinarius vulpinus

W
Cortinarius walkeri
Cortinarius walpolensis – Australia
Cortinarius washingtonensis
Cortinarius watamukiensis
Cortinarius watsonii
Cortinarius weberi
Cortinarius weberianus
Cortinarius westii
Cortinarius whiteae
Cortinarius wiebeae
Cortinarius wirrabara – Australia (Tasmania)

X

Cortinarius xantheuodes
Cortinarius xanthocephaloides
Cortinarius xanthocephalus
Cortinarius xanthochlorus
Cortinarius xanthocholus
Cortinarius xanthodryophilus
Cortinarius xantholamellatus
Cortinarius xantholilacinus
Cortinarius xantho-ochraceus
Cortinarius xanthophylloides
Cortinarius xanthophyllus
Cortinarius xanthopus
Cortinarius xanthosarx
Cortinarius xanthosuavis
Cortinarius xenosma
Cortinarius xerampelinus
Cortinarius xerophilus
Cortinarius xiphidipus
Cortinarius xylochroma
Cortinarius xylocinnamomeus

Y
Cortinarius yerillus – Australia (New South Wales)

Z
Cortinarius zakii – edible, but deadly look-alikes (C. gentilis)
Cortinarius zinziberatus
Cortinarius zonatus – France
Cortinarius zosteroides – United Kingdom

References

Cortinarius